Manuel Leuthard (born 31 October 1998) is a Swiss swimmer, he is a multiple times Swiss national champion in the 50 meter freestyle and butterfly and 100 meter freestyle. He competed in the men's 50 metre butterfly event at the 2018 FINA World Swimming Championships (25 m), in Hangzhou, China.

References

External links
 

1998 births
Living people
Swiss male butterfly swimmers
Place of birth missing (living people)
Swimmers at the 2015 European Games
European Games competitors for Switzerland
21st-century Swiss people